Black Garnet Books is a bookstore in Minnesota. The only Black-owned, brick and mortar bookstore in the state, it operated as a pop-up for a year before receiving a grant from the city of Saint Paul, Minnesota, to open a physical location.

Establishment 

In June 2020, University of Minnesota graduate Dionne Sims discovered that there were no Black-owned bookstores in the state of Minnesota while researching ways to support the Black community after the murder of George Floyd. (Ancestry Books, a Black-owned bookstore in Minnesota, closed in 2015. Other Black-owned book businesses, such as Mind's Eye Comics and Babycake's Book Stack, do not have brick and mortar bookstore locations.) After Sims posted a tweet expressing her desire to start a Black-owned bookstore in the state, the tweet received more than 14,000 likes, and she began a crowdfunding campaign for the bookstore on July 10. By July 12, the campaign had raised more than $81,000. Overall, she raised more than $108,000 in the campaign using GoFundMe.

In 2021, Black Garnet Books operated as a pop-up. Sims told the Star Tribune that funds raised from the crowdfunding campaign helped to cover the startup costs and pay for inventory but that they did not cover construction of a physical bookstore space. Also in 2021, Saint Paul City Councilor Mitra Jalali provided Sims with information about a Neighborhood STAR grant, and she received a $100,000 grant from the city of Saint Paul to renovate and open a location at Hamline Station in the Midway neighborhood. , the  space is planned to open in summer 2022.

Purpose 
Black Garnet Books was planned to focus on Black authors and other diverse authors, and to stock books for adults and young adults to avoid competition with Babycake's Book Stack, a bookmobile in Saint Paul, Minnesota, focused on diverse children's literature. Sims told Mpls.St.Paul in 2020 that she wanted the bookstore to be "a place people can go for self-empowerment" through "education, connection, [and] the pursuit of knowledge".

Activity 
In November 2021, Black Garnet Books began a book drive on Bookshop.org to donate copies of The 1619 Project: A New Origin Story to schools in the Minneapolis–Saint Paul area. , the drive had drawn more than 700 donations.

References

External links 

 
 Black Garnet Books on Bookshop.org

2020 establishments in Minnesota
Black-owned companies of the United States
Crowdfunding projects
Independent bookstores of the United States
African-American history of Minnesota